The Saints of Georgia is a book of hagiography published by Bessarion. It is a primary source of biographies of saints, including the following:

Abiathar and Sidonia
Abibo Joseph

References

Sources
Holweck, F. G. A Biographical Dictionary of the Saints. St. Louis, MO: B. Herder Book Co. 1924.

Christian hagiography